Çələbilər (also, Chelabilar and Chelyabilyar) is a village and municipality in the Barda Rayon of Azerbaijan.  It has a population of 758.

References 

Populated places in Barda District